Asociación Corredores de Turismo Carretera (ACTC) is a governing body based in Argentina that specializes in auto racing competitions. It was founded on 30 August 1960, initially as a representative body and defender of the rights of drivers who competed in the Turismo Carretera category (hence its name), and then transformed in the mid-1970s into a competition inspection body, independent of the highest automotive body in Argentina: The Argentine Automobile Club. Currently, the ACTC is chaired by the former Turismo Carretera driver Hugo Mazzacane, and is in charge of the supervision of all the divisions of the TC. In addition to this category, ACTC also supervised the competitions of the Top Race V6 category, which it created in 1997 and which it ceased to audit in 2011.

References

External links
 

 
1960 establishments in Argentina
Auto racing organizations
Companies based in Buenos Aires
Motorsport in Argentina
Sports governing bodies in Argentina
Stock car racing